The following is a list of Abilene Christian Wildcats men's basketball head coaches. The Wildcats have had 15 head coaches in their 102-season history.

Abilene Christian's current head coach is Brette Tanner. He was promoted to head coach in April 2021 to replace Joe Golding, who left to become the head coach at UTEP.

References

Abilene Christian

Abilene Christian Wildcats men's basketball coaches